Hurricane Tina was the strongest and longest-lived storm of the 1992 Pacific hurricane season, which also threatened land for a brief period. The twenty-fourth tropical cyclone, twenty-second tropical storm, fourteenth hurricane, and eighth major hurricane of the record breaking season, Tina formed from a tropical wave on September 17. The storm moved towards the west and strengthened into a hurricane. A breakdown in a ridge and to the north and a trough then re-curved Tina to the northeast and towards land, still moving slowly and gradually slowing down. The trough broke down and was replaced by a strong ridge. Tina then changed direction again and headed out to sea. It intensified into a Category 4 storm with winds of 150 mph (240 km/h) and a central pressure of 932 millibars. Tina then slowly weakened as it turned to the north. Tropical Depression Tina dissipated on October 11, shortly after entering the Central Pacific Hurricane Center's area of responsibility. Although the tropical cyclone never made landfall, heavy rains were recorded across western Mexico. While at peak intensity, the storm also displayed annular characteristics.

Meteorological history

Tina originated from a tropical wave that left the African coast on September 5. Six days later, the wave moved through the Lesser Antilles. The wave generated disorganized fare-ups while entering the Caribbean Sea, but due to strong wind shear further development failed to occur. The system began to become more organized and at 1200 UTC on September 17, the NHC upgraded the disturbance into a tropical depression, the twenty-second of the season, as the disturbance had changed dramatically in organization. The depression became Tropical Storm Tina on the next day. The system began an intensifying trend, and Tina strengthened into a moderate tropical storm 24 hours after attaining tropical storm status, and the NHC forecasted Tina to become a hurricane.

As forecasted, Tina reached hurricane status at 1800 UTC on September 20. Tina reached a secondary peak of 85 mph (140 km/h) on the next day. By September 21, shear began to take a toll on the hurricane, as deep convection decreased. Tina briefly weakened back into a tropical storm, but regained hurricane intensity for another two days. However, data from a Hurricane Hunter aircraft indicated that Tina had weakened back to tropical storm status, thus ending the first of three strengthening trends of Hurricane Tina. By September 24, Tropical Storm Tina took a sharp turn north-northeast towards the west coast of Mexico, due to a combination of a weakness in a subtropical ridge and a mid-level to low-level trough passing north of the tropical cyclone. Shortly thereafter, an anticyclone  developed west of the Baja California Coast.

By September 27, steering flow moved Tina away from the coast of Mexico, where there was little wind shear. The tropical storm then began to re-intensify. Tina regained hurricane status on September 28 as it accelerated. On September 28, Tina had reached major hurricane intensity. The next day, Tina continued intensify, becoming a Category 4 hurricane on the Saffir-Simpson hurricane scale. Overnight on September 30, Tina peaked with winds of 150 mph (240 km/h) and a pressure of 930 mbar. On October 1, the hurricane underwent fluctuations in intensity.

Tina began to change its path over the next days due to an approaching trough which allowed Tina to turn northbound into cooler sea surface temperatures, as well as into an area of increasing wind shear. The eye became very large, peaking in size on October 4. However, the less favorable environment caused Tina to slowly weaken. The system weakened back to tropical storm status late on October 4. Tina's motion decreased due to weak steering currents. As such, Tina continued to weaken, and was downgraded into a tropical depression. At this time, only a swirl of clouds remained, with limited deep convection. The next day Tina moved into the Central Pacific Hurricane Center's area of responsibility and six hours later, the storm's winds had dropped to 30 mph (45 km/h). Tina still maintained a small area of deep convection, despite decreasing seas surface temperatures, until dissipation on October 11.

Records, preparations, and impact
When Tropical Storm Tina was tracking northeastward toward Mexico, the National Hurricane Center noted the possibility of landfall, although all of the tropical cyclone forecast models correctly indicated a westward turn would occur. While passing the region, Tina dropped heavy rainfall that produced flooding along the west coast of Mexico.

Lasting 22 days, Hurricane Tina surpassed Hurricane Fico as the longest lived storm in the northeastern Pacific. Hurricane John (1994) became the longest-lived tropical cyclone in the northern Pacific a couple years later.

See also

Other storms of the same name
Pacific hurricane
List of Category 4 Pacific hurricanes

References

Tina
Tina (1992)